The 77th Massachusetts General Court, consisting of the Massachusetts Senate and the Massachusetts House of Representatives, met in 1856 during the governorship of Henry Gardner. Elihu C. Baker served as president of the Senate and Charles A. Phelps served as speaker of the House.

Topics discussed included banks, bridges, fisheries, hospitals, prisons, railroads, schools, and other matters.

Senators

Representatives

See also
 34th United States Congress
 List of Massachusetts General Courts

References

External links
 
 

Political history of Massachusetts
Massachusetts legislative sessions
massachusetts
1856 in Massachusetts